Wild Geese (Irish: Na Géanna Fiáine CLG ) are a GAA club based in Oldtown, Fingal. They currently field a single junior football, two junior hurling and previously a ladies football team. At juvenile level they field at hurling only with teams at Under 9, 10, 12, 14 and 16. In Los Angeles there is a Gaelic football club who also go by the same name and at Lakenheath U.S. air force base there is a hurling club also called Wild Geese.

History
The club was established in 1888 by Patrick Archer making it one of the oldest in Dublin. Other GAA clubs in the surrounding area at the time would have been the Garristown Liberators and Magh go Bragh of Naul. The club in Oldtown was called Wild Geese to commemorate those Irish who had travelled abroad to serve in the militaries of other countries. Royal Irish Constabulary records show that the club had 40 members in 1889 and 1890 meeting in Oldtown and Ballyboghill. P. Mahon was secretary and treasurer at the time and E. Gorman was captain. Wild Geese were one of nineteen clubs represented at Charles Stewart Parnells funeral in 1891. In 1893 P. Sutton attended the Dublin county boards annual convention as the club's delegate on 19 March. However in 1896 the club's name is missing from a list of those affiliated to the county board suggesting the club may have disbanded sometime between 1893-1896. In 1906 the nearest club to Oldtown was Naul but the club was affiliated along with Naul and Garristown in 1911 and again in 1915 and for the 1924-1925 season with the club disbanding once again.

While absent from the field of play in 1931 the club was reformed by Father Lennon and played their games in a field owned by Jim Hughes. Players were from not just Oldtown but also Rolestown and Ballyboughal.  The team captain was Stephen Griffin. They won the Feis Cup beating Donabate in the final. Some time after however a dispute arose those from Ballyboughal and the rest in the club with those from Ballyboughal deciding to leave and set up their own club. In order to see who would keep the set of jerseys both sides agreed to a game to resolve the issue with Wild Geese winning meaning they kept the jerseys which are the club's colours to this day, black and amber. However the club was to disband sometime shortly after and this the years to come a club was established in nearby Rolestown called Fingal Ravens.
Patrick Archer reformed the club in 1935 but it disbanded again sometime before 1947 before regrouping again in a year where the GAA appeared to undergo something of a revival in the area with Fingal Ravens, Garristown and Man O’War also affiliating. Ballyboughal had won a Junior Football Championship in that year. However both Wild Geese and Fingal Ravens were finding it difficult to field and Fingal Ravens joined up with Wild Geese. The club disbanded some years after and in 1952 Fingal Rovers hurling club was established in Rolestown with many players having previously played with Wild Geese among their membership. Meeting were held in Hurley makers Owen and Tommie Butlers and they travelled to matches in their van. Fingal Rovers were runners up in the Fingal Hurling League, losing to Portrane but won a County special competition defeating Porton Docks in Islandbridge. Wild Geese reformed some years after and continued to compete on and off through the years.

Club facilities
The name Wild Geese made an appearance in ‘Gaelic weekly’ in 1954 where it was revealed the club had purchased a field and sown a crop of wheat. They had also plans to sow a crop of spring oats and it was hoped that this would make the ground easier to level and sow grass. Wild Geese played Ballyboughal on a challenge game at Damastown Sports in 1954 also with a picture of the team featuring in the Irish independent. Wild Geese were listed as one of eleven clubs who owned or leased their grounds in a special report by the county board.

In 1968, the club started work on the first full size indoor handball alley in the country, this was completed in 1969, Oldtown subsequently produced a series of world champions. Although largely unused in recent years, the alley was refurbished in advance of its 50th birthday.

In 2009 and 2010 the club refurbished their changing rooms, added a meeting room and public toilets, replaced pitch side fencing and upgraded their pitch.

Gaelic football
Since 1982 the club has fielded a single football team. In 1986 they were competing at the intermediate grade in the Fingal league and won the McArdle Cup in the same year. in 2007 they were relegated to Division 10. In 2008 they reached the Junior E Football Championship Final, losing out to Park Rangers. In 2009 they again made the final and defeated St. Brendan’s of Grangegorman. The club also enjoyed successive promotions in 2009 they were promoted from Division 10 North to Division 9. In 2010 they were promoted to Division 8. The club won the Sheridan Cup in 2007 and 2009. In 2010 they were defeated by Stars of Erin of Glencullen in the Junior D Football Championship.

Football Roll of Honour
 2014 Promoted to Dublin AFL Div. 7
 2010 Dublin Junior D Football Championship Runners Up
 2010 Promoted to Dublin AFL Div. 8
 2009 Dublin Junior E Football Championship Winners
 2009 Dublin AFL Div. 10: Runners Up
 2008 Dublin Junior E Football Championship Runners Up
 2007, 2009 Sheridan Cup Winners
 1986 McArdle Cup Winners
 1931 Feis Cup Winners

Hurling
Hurling in Oldtown dates back to the 19th century. Founding member Patrick Archer found that the older people in the area were able to recall that hurling was a popular sport in Fingal up to around the 1820 and called camanachd, a word still used in Scotland describing their own native stick game, shinty. The decline of hurling coincides with the Tithe war, the O’Connell campaign, the resulting decline in landlord-tenant relations and the farmers unwilling to lend their fields for games to be played as they at times ended in melees. Another influence was the Catholic Church who disapproved of the dances that took place after games.
In 2008 Wild Geese set up a hurling team and entered into Division 7 of the 8 divisions at the time and the Junior E Championship. Members of the hurling team did not all play football with the club with some playing with Fingal Ravens, Garristown, Clann Mhuire, Ballyboughal. They failed to win a game that season and were relegated to Division 8. The following year was to be their most successful to date. Wild Geese won Division 8 defeating Setanta of Ballymun in the league final. They also took part in the Leinster hurling league and entered an Under 21 team into the hurling championship. They hosted the first ever Gus Warren Challenge Cup game against Erin go Bragh winning 2-9 to 2-5. Mattie Lambe was also selected for the Fingal county hurling panel. In subsequent years Oriol Hally-Garcia, Dara O'Brien and Nathan McCaffrey were selected for the Fingal county hurling panel. Former Clare manager Ger Loughnane took the team for a training session. 2010 was to be another hard year for the club and for the 2012 season the club dropped from Division 7 to Division 9 and the Junior F Championship. Aidan Lenehan wrote a book called 'There is a F in Hurling' which was published in November 2012. The book was about the setting up of a hurling team in the club, the challenges and difficulties encountered and the highs and lows experienced since the team's inception in 2007.

2018 was a very successful year for the Wild Geese hurlers. Not only are they fielding several underage teams, they now have two adult hurling teams. As of 2019 they will be participating in AHL7 and AHL9 respectively. 2018 saw the 1st team win Division 8 and go unbeaten throughout the campaign. They also lost out in the Quarter Finals of the Championship to eventual winners St. Joseph's OCB, who on their day would have been a match for many senior teams. Former Fingal hurling manager Mick Kennedy came on board and offered the team additional coaching experience.

Roll of Honour
 2018 Dublin Hurling League Division 8 Winners
 2016 Dublin Junior E Hurling Championship Runners up
 2009 Dublin Hurling League Division 8 Winners
 2009 Gus Warren Challenge Cup Winners

Juvenile section
Wild Geese set up a hurling juvenile section in 2008 with Under 9, 10 and 11 teams. The Under 11 team won their league in 2009 and in 2010 the Under 13 team were Division 5 runners up. The club hosted the Division 4 hurling Feile in 2011. The competition was held in nearby Fingal Ravens ground in Rolestown as there was a need for two pitches and the club's ground at Oldtown only had a single pitch.

Underage Honours
 2010 Dublin Under 13 Hurling League Div. 5 Runners Up 
 2009 Dublin Under 11 Hurling League Winners

Ladies' football
The club set up a ladies' football team in 2011 and hope to set up a ladies underage section in the future

Camogie
Wild Geese Gaa started a camogie team in 2018. It has been many years since Camogie was played on the hallowed pitches of Oldtown. They played their first game this year since the middle of the last century. 2019 has started positively with the Camogie set to continue and the girls actively seeking new members.

References

Other sources
 Dublin Ladies Gaelic website 
 The Gaelic Athletic Association in Dublin 1884-2000 (2005) Editor and compiler: William Nolan Contributors: Jim Wren, Marcus de Búrca, David Gorry 
 Official Club Web-Site
 Dublin Club GAA
 Dublin GAA
 Wild Geese Facebook page

Gaelic games clubs in Fingal
Gaelic football clubs in Fingal
Hurling clubs in Fingal
1888 establishments in Ireland